is Japanese singer Ringo Sheena's 4th single and it was released on October 27, 1999, by Toshiba EMI / East World. The single was certified double platinum by the RIAJ for 800,000 copies shipped to stores, and later gold for 100,000 downloads to cellphones in 2011.

Background 
"Honnō" is taken from Sheena's second album Shōso Strip and is presently her best selling single. The music video and album art, which featured Sheena in a traditional nurse's dress and cap shattering a screen of glass, became a hot topic at its release.
Sheena had originally planned to release "Gips" at this point. However, she reversed this decision, believing that the "freshness" of "Gips" had already faded as she had promoted the song in her previous Japanese tour. She substituted it with the earlier recorded "Honnō", to much success.

The song was used as a theme song for the music TV show Fun (Fun's Recommend #007). The song was covered as a part of a medley by Rie Tomosaka on the television show The Yoru mo Hippare on September 9, 2000. Satoko Nishikawa of Shang Shang Typhoon covered it on her solo album Hibiki in 2006, and by Dorlis on her greatest hits album Dorlis (2012).

The B-sides "Aozora" and "Rinne Highlight" were used in TV commercials for Suntory's The Cocktail Bar Love Story, "Rinne Headlight" in 1999 and "Aozora" in 2000.

Track listing

Chart rankings

Sales and certifications

Credits and personnel 
Honnō
 Vocals: Ringo Sheena  
 Guitars: Yukio Nagoshi 
 Bass guitars: Seiji Kameda
 Piano: Yuta Saito 
 Drums: Masayuki Muraishi 
 Synthesizer Programming: Nobuhiko Nakayama

Aozora
 Vocals, Whistle: Ringo Sheena 
 Guitars: Susumu Nishikawa 
 Bass guitars: Seiji Kameda
 Organ: Yuta Saito
 Synthesizer: Makoto Minagawa 
 Fluegelhorn: Yokan Mizue
 Drums, percussion, Toys: Koichi Asakura "Asa-Chang" (from Asa-Chang & Junray, ex-Tokyo Ska Paradise Orchestra)
 Synthesizer Operator: Nobuhiko Nakayama

Rin-ne Highlight 
 Piano: Ken Shima 
 Contrabass: Kenji Takamizu
 Drums: Yuichi Tokashiki

Music video cast 
Honnō
 Vocal & Nurse: Ringo Sheena 
 Electric bass guitar & Doctor: Yasunobu Torii (from Panicsmile, Gaji)
 Others: Kunihiro Suda (He is an actor. Sheena and he was the same class in high school.)

Notes 

Ringo Sheena songs
1999 songs
1999 singles
Songs written by Ringo Sheena
Song recordings produced by Seiji Kameda